George Thomas Cole (16 February 1846 – 6 December 1900) was an English first-class cricketer.

Cole was born at Poplar in February 1846. He made two appearances in first-class cricket for the Surrey Club in 1873 against the Marylebone Cricket Club at Lord's and The Oval. He scored 55 runs in these two matches, with a highest score of 21. He died in December 1900 at Islington.

References

External links

1846 births
1900 deaths
People from Poplar, London
English cricketers
Surrey Club cricketers